Beloomut is an urban locality (an urban-type settlement) in Lukhovitsky District of Moscow Oblast, Russia. The population is

References

Urban-type settlements in Moscow Oblast
Zaraysky Uyezd